Wazir is a village in Khogyani District, Nangarhar Province, Afghanistan. It is the biggest village of the district. The population is Pashtun. Among the Khogyanis, the Lalai offshoot of the Wazirs live in the village.

See also 
Nangarhar Province

References

Populated places in Nangarhar Province